Transcendental Étude No. 1 in C major "Preludio" is the first of twelve Transcendental Études by Franz Liszt. It is a short piece that can be played in less than a minute at concert speed.

Form
Octaved Cs begin the piece, immediately followed by a downward run made up of an arpeggiated C7 chord. A furious set of impetuous notes then climb slowly, and it returns to the octaved Cs and the downward run. The left hand then plays some loud, low pitched trills in succession. After that, the right hand plays some intense arpeggiated figures, and then a final closing chord. This étude is one of the less difficult to play along with Transcendental Étude No. 3 (Paysage).

References

External links
 

Transcendental 01
1852 compositions
Compositions in C major